Sandra M. "Sandy" Pihos (born June 11, 1946) is the former Republican member of the Illinois State Representative for the 42nd and 48th districts.  She currently resides in the western Chicago suburb of Glen Ellyn.

Representative Pihos served on eight committees: Committee of the Whole, Elementary and Secondary Education, Housing and Urban Development, Mass Transit, Telecommunications, Tourism and Conventions, Paratransit, and Subcommittee on School Code Waivers.

In her run for a seventh term in 2014, Pihos was defeated in the March Republican primary by Peter Breen, who went on to win the general election.

Pihos was arrested for retail theft in the fall of 2017 and pled guilty to a single misdemeanor count in June 2018.

References

External links
Representative Sandra M. Pihos (R) 42nd District at the Illinois General Assembly
By session: 98th, 97th, 96th, 95th, 94th, 93rd
State Representative Sandra Pihos constituency site
 
Sandra Pihos at Illinois House Republican Caucus

1946 births
21st-century American politicians
21st-century American women politicians
American people of Greek descent
Living people
Republican Party members of the Illinois House of Representatives
People from Glen Ellyn, Illinois
Women state legislators in Illinois
Illinois politicians convicted of crimes